Nathan W. Shock (1906–1989) was the head of the Gerontology Research Center of the National Institutes of Health for nearly 35 years - until 1976. He then became scientist emeritus at the center. Some people call him the "father of gerontology" (although the same title is also applied to Vladimir Korenchevsky and Ilya Mechnikov).

He was one of the first scientists to foresee the importance of using longitudinal methods to study human aging. He clocked the rate at which different organs of the body age and showed that different individuals age at different rates.

He was the author of more than 300 journal articles and books, and detailed his research in Scientific American 206:100-10, 1962.

Education

He got his B.S. in chemistry in 1926, his M.S. in organic chemistry in 1927 from Purdue University, and his Ph.D. in physiology/psychology in 1930 from the University of Chicago.

References

American gerontologists
1906 births
1989 deaths
Purdue University alumni
University of Chicago alumni